Finavon Castle lies on the River South Esk, about a quarter of a mile south of Milton of Finavon village and five miles to the north-east of Forfar in Angus, Scotland. The name is applied both to a ruined 17th-century castle (contemporarily referred to as Finhaven Castle), as well as the 19th-century mansion house 130m to the west.

History
The estate was the property of the Lindsay Earls of Crawford from 1375, who built the now-ruined castle. David Lindsay, 10th Earl of Crawford, married Margaret, the daughter of Cardinal David Beaton, at Finavon in 1546.

Extravagance ruined the Crawford fortunes, and in 1625 the barony of Finavon was disposed of by a forced sale to Alexander Lindsay, 2nd Lord Spynie. It passed through the Carnegie family, the Gordon Earls of Aboyne and the Gardynes.

In 1843 the castle was bought by  Thomas Gardyne of Middleton. Through an 18th-century marriage he came of the old Lindsay stock. His descendant, Lieutenant-Colonel Alan David Greenhill Gardyne died in 1953, leaving the estate to a daughter, Mrs Susan Mazur.

The castle

The castle was an L-plan tower-house of five storeys, with a garret and a courtyard. The tower visible today dates from about 1600. Excavations have revealed that the tower is an adjunct tacked onto the north-east corner of a much older, more extensive structure.

The house
The house is a Scottish baronial style mansion built in 1865 for the then laird, David Greenhill Gardyne, by Messrs Carver and Symon of Arbroath.

Life at the castle
J. B. Burke recorded what life was like at Finavon Castle, saying:
The inner life of the family was of an [sic] uniform but enjoyable character; martial exercise, the chase, and the baronial banquet, enlivened by the songs of the minstrel and the quips of the jester, occupied the day and the evening was wiled away in ‘the playing of the chess, at the tables, in reading of romans, in ringing and piping, in harping, and in other honest solaces of great pleasure and disport,’ the ladies mingling in the scene throughout, whether in the sports and festivities of the morning, or the pastimes of the evening—though a portion of the day was always spent in their ‘bowers’ with their attendant maidens spinning or weaving tapestry. Occasionally, indeed, a higher responsibility devolved upon them,—during  the absence of the Earl, whether in attendance on the Parliament or in warfare, public or private, his wife became the chatelaine or keeper of his castle with full authority to rule his vassals, guide his affairs, and defend his stronghold if attacked at disadvantage during his absence.

Other nearby features
The nearby Finavon Doocot is Scotland's largest doocot, with 2400 nesting boxes. It is believed to have been built for the Earl of Crawford in the 16th century and is now maintained by the National Trust for Scotland.

On Finavon Hill, above the castle there is a vitrified Iron Age hillfort dating from the mid-1st millennium BCE.

The Finavon Castle beat on the River South Esk provides salmon and seatrout fly fishing.

References

 Rewritten and corrected by James Gammack

Castles in Angus, Scotland
Country houses in Angus, Scotland
Category B listed buildings in Angus, Scotland
Listed castles in Scotland
Scheduled Ancient Monuments in Angus